Smerinthus visinskasi is a species of moth of the  family Sphingidae. It is known from north-western Kazakhstan.

References

Smerinthus
Moths described in 2009